Hungarian Revolution most often refers to:
Hungarian Revolution of 1848
Revolutions and interventions in Hungary (1918–1920), the Communist revolution to establish the Hungarian Soviet Republic
Hungarian Revolution of 1956

Hungarian Revolution can also refer to:
Rákóczi's War of Independence
Aster Revolution
End of communism in Hungary